Luz Dary Castro Lemos (born May 30, 1978, in Bogotá) is a female shot putter and discus thrower from Colombia.

Career
She set her personal best (16.70m) in the women's shot put at a meet in Santiago de Chile on August 5, 2003.

Achievements

References

External links

Profile

1978 births
Living people
Sportspeople from Bogotá
Colombian female shot putters
Colombian female discus throwers
Athletes (track and field) at the 2003 Pan American Games
Pan American Games competitors for Colombia
Central American and Caribbean Games gold medalists for Colombia
Competitors at the 2002 Central American and Caribbean Games
Central American and Caribbean Games medalists in athletics
20th-century Colombian women
21st-century Colombian women